The First Fitna was the first civil war in the Islamic community. It led to the overthrow of the Rashidun Caliphate and the establishment of the Umayyad Caliphate. The civil war involved three main battles between the fourth Rashidun caliph, Ali, and the rebel groups.

The roots of the first civil war can be traced back to the assassination of the second caliph, Umar. Before he died from his wounds, Umar formed a six-member council which elected Uthman as the next caliph. During the final years of Uthman's caliphate, he was accused of nepotism and killed by rebels in 656. After Uthman's assassination, Ali was elected the fourth caliph. Aisha, Talha, and Zubayr revolted against Ali to depose him. The two parties fought the Battle of the Camel in December 656, from which Ali emerged victorious. Afterward, Mu'awiya, the incumbent governor of Syria, declared war on Ali ostensibly to avenge Uthman's death. The two parties fought the Battle of Siffin in July 657, which ended in a stalemate and arbitration. This arbitration was resented by the Kharijites, who declared Ali, Mu'awiya, and their followers infidels. Following Kharijite violence against civilians, Ali's forces crushed them in the Battle of Nahrawan. Soon after, Mu'awiya also seized control of Egypt with the aid of Amr ibn al-As. 

In 661, Ali was assassinated by the Kharijite Abd al-Rahman ibn Muljam. After Ali's death, his heir Hasan was elected caliph and soon after attacked by Mu'awiya. The embattled Hasan concluded a peace treaty, acknowledging the rule of Mu'awiya, who subsequently founded the Umayyad Caliphate and ruled as its first caliph.

Background
Following Muhammad's death in 632, Abu Bakr became the leader of the Muslim community. After reasserting Muslim control over the dissident tribes of Arabia, he sent armies to fight against the empires of Byzantium and Sasanian Persia, initiating a wave of conquests which were continued by his successor Umar. These battles brought about the near-total collapse of the Sasanians, and restricted the Byzantine Empire to Anatolia, North Africa, and its holdings in Europe. The conquests brought Muslims bounteous revenue and lands. In Iraq, the lands of the Persian crown and aristocracy were now in Muslim hands. These became state-administered communal property. The revenue was distributed among the conquering troops, who settled in Iraq. Umar also left provincial administration to regional governors, who ruled with considerable autonomy. Provincial surplus was spent on the Muslim settlers of the conquered territories rather than forwarded to the capital, Medina.

Uthman succeeded Umar upon the latter's assassination by a slave in 644. The new caliph's policies elicited discontent among the Muslim elite as well as accusations of nepotism. He began centralizing power by relying on his Umayyad relatives, who had long opposed Muhammad before converting to Islam in 630. His favor toward relatives was to the exclusion of other members of the Quraysh, who had enjoyed significant authority during the reign of his two predecessors. He appointed his kinsmen to all of the provincial governorships. Although Uthman continued Muslim expansion in Persia and Egypt, these conquests came to a halt by the later half of his reign. The influx of spoils slowed, magnifying economic issues that had previously been tempered by incoming revenue. This was coupled with Arab nomads' antipathy toward central authority, which had hitherto been superseded by the continued war effort. The continued migration of tribes from Arabia to the conquered territories also resulted in reduced payments from the revenue of the lands, which led to resentment among the earlier settlers. Early settlers also saw their status threatened by land grants in the conquered territories to prominent Qurayshites like Talha ibn Ubayd Allah and Zubayr ibn al-Awwam, as well as land acquisitions by late-arriving tribal chiefs, such as Ashath ibn Qays. These chiefs were given this territory in exchange for their lands in Arabia. Furthermore, Uthman took control of the crown lands of Iraq as state assets, and demanded that the provincial surplus be forwarded to the caliph. This interference in provincial affairs brought about widespread opposition to his rule, especially from Iraq and Egypt, where the majority of the conquering armies had settled. 

Encouraged by the Medinese elite including prominent figures like Talha, Zubayr, Amr ibn al-As (a former governor of Egypt who Uthman deposed), and Muhammad's widow Aisha, the provincial opposition subsequently broadened into open rebellion. Dissidents from Egypt and Iraq marched on Medina, killing the caliph in June 656. Ali, Muhammad's cousin and son-in-law, was subsequently recognized caliph.

Battle of the Camel

Aisha, Talha, and Zubayr opposed Ali's succession and gathered in Mecca, where they demanded vengeance for Uthman's death and the election of a new caliph, presumably either Talha or Zubayr, through consultation. The rebels raised an army and captured Basra from Ali's governor, inflicting heavy casualties on his men, with the intention of strengthening their position. Ali sent his son Hasan to mobilize troops in Kufa. After Ali arrived in Kufa himself, the combined army marched to Basra.

The two armies met outside of Basra. After three days of failed negotiations, the battle began in the afternoon of 8 December 656 and lasted until the evening. Zubayr left the field without fighting. Likely for the dishonorable act of leaving his fellow Muslims behind in a civil war he caused, Zubayr was pursued and killed by the troops of al-Ahnaf bin Qays, a chief of the Banu Sa'd who had remained on the sidelines of the battle. Talha was killed by the Umayyad Marwan ibn al-Hakam.

With the deaths of Talha and Zubayr, the fate of the battle was sealed in favor of Ali. However, the fight continued until Ali's troops succeeded in killing Aisha's camel, which her forces had rallied around. From this camel, the battle received its name. After admonishing Aisha, Ali sent her back to Medina, escorted by her brother. Ali also announced a public pardon and set the prisoners free. This pardon was also extended to high-profile rebels, including Marwan, who soon joined with his Umayyad kinsman Mu'awiya ibn Abi Sufyan, the governor of Syria, as a senior advisor.

Battle of Siffin

Shortly after assuming power, Ali dismissed most governors whom he considered corrupt, including Mu'awiya, Uthman's cousin. Mu'awiya refused to step down and informed Ali through a representative that he would recognize Ali as caliph in exchange for the governorship of Syria and Egypt for life. Ali rejected this proposal.

In response, Mu'awiya declared war on Ali on behalf of the Syrians, demanding vengeance for Uthman's death. The governor aimed to depose Ali and establish a Syrian council to appoint the next caliph, who would presumably be Mu'awiya himself. Ali responded by letter that Mu'awiya was welcome to bring his case to Ali's court of justice, asking him to offer any evidence that would incriminate Ali in the murder of Uthman. Ali also challenged Mu'awiya to name any Syrian who would qualify for a council. 

Ali called a council of Islamic ruling elite which urged him to fight Mu'awiya. The two armies met at Siffin, west of the Euphrates, in 657 CE. There, the two sides negotiated for weeks. Notably, Mu'awiya repeated his proposition to recognize Ali in return for Syria and Egypt, which was again rejected. In turn, Ali challenged Mu'awiya to a one-on-one duel to settle the matters and avoid the bloodshed. This offer was declined by Mu'awiya. The negotiations ceased without success on 18 July 657 and the two sides prepared for the battle. Fighting began on Wednesday, 26 July, and lasted for three or four days. By the final day, the balance had shifted in Ali's favor. When Mu'awiya was informed his army could not win, he decided to appeal to the Quran. Before noon, Syrians raised copies of the book on their lances, shouting, "Let the book of God be the judge between us."Although Ali was suspicious of this appeal, his forces ceased fighting. Compelled by strong peace sentiments in his army and threats of mutiny, Ali accepted a proposal for arbitration.

Arbitration

The majority in Ali's army pressed for the reportedly neutral Abu Musa al-Ashari as their representative. Ali considered Abu Musa politically naive, but appointed him despite these reservations. In an agreement on 2 August, 657 CE, Abu Musa represented Ali's army while Mu'awiya's top general, Amr ibn al-As, represented the other side. The two representatives committed to adhere to the Quran and Sunnah, and to save the Muslim community from war and division.

The two arbitrators met together, first at Dumat al-Jandal and then at Udhruh, and the proceedings likely lasted until mid April 658 CE. At Dumat al-Jandal, the arbitrators reached the verdict that Uthman had been killed wrongfully and that Mu'awiya had the right to seek revenge. According to scholar Wilferd Madelung, this verdict was political rather than judicial, and a blunder of the naive Abu Musa. This verdict strengthened the Syrians' support for Mu'awiya and weakened the position of Ali.

The second meeting at Udhruh likely broke up in disarray when Amr violated his earlier agreement with Abu Musa. The Kufan delegation reacted furiously to Abu Musa's concessions, and the erstwhile arbitrator fled to Mecca in disgrace.  Conversely, Amr was received triumphantly by Mu'awiya on his return to Syria. After the conclusion of the arbitration in 659 CE, Syrians pledged their allegiance to Mu'awiya as the next caliph. Ali denounced the conduct of the two arbitrators as contrary to the Quran and began to organize a new expedition to Syria.

Battle of Nahrawan 

Following the Battle of Siffin, a group separated from Ali when he agreed to settle the dispute with Mu'awiya through arbitration, a move considered by the group as against the Quran. Most of them had pressured Ali to accept the arbitration, but subsequently reversed course and declared that the right to judgment belonged to God alone. While Ali largely succeeded in regaining their support, the remaining opponents of arbitration gathered in Nahrawan, on the east bank of the Tigris. Due to their exodus, this group became known as the Kharijites, from the Arabic for "to go out" or "to rise in revolt".

The Kharijites elected Abd Allah ibn Wahb al-Rasibi as their caliph. They denounced Ali's leadership, and declared him, his followers, and the Syrians to be infidels. They declared the shedding blood of such infidels to be licit. The Kharijites began interrogating civilians about their views on Uthman and Ali, and executing those who did not share their views. In one notable incident, the Kharijites disemboweled a farmer's pregnant wife, cut out and killed her unborn infant, before beheading the farmer. Kharijites have been viewed as the forerunners of Islamic extremists.
Ali received the news of the Kharijites' violence and moved to Nahrawan with his army. There, he asked the Kharjites to surrender the murderers and return to their families. The Kharijites, however, responded defiantly that they were collectively responsible for the murders. After multiple failed attempts at deescalation, Ali announced an amnesty (that did not apply to murderers) and barred his army from commencing hostilities. The remaining Kharijites, estimated at 2,800, attacked and were vanquished by the vastly superior army of Ali. The injured, estimated at 400, were pardoned by Ali.

In January 661, while praying at the Mosque of Kufa, Ali was assassinated by the Kharijite Abd al-Rahman ibn Muljam.

Peace treaty with Hasan

After the assassination of Ali in January 661, his eldest son, Hasan, was elected caliph in Kufa. Mu'awiya quickly marched on Kufa with a large army, while Hasan's military response suffered defections in large numbers. These were facilitated by military commanders and tribal chiefs who had been swayed to Mu'awiya's side by promises and offers of money. Hasan was wounded in a failed attempt on his life. By the time Hasan agreed to a peace treaty with Mu'awiya, his authority did not exceed the area around Kufa Under this treaty, Hasan ceded the caliphate to Mu'awiya. The treaty stipulated a general amnesty for the people and the return of the caliphate to Hasan after Mu'awiya's death. Mu'awiyah was crowned as caliph at a ceremony in Jerusalem in 661. 

Hasan predeceased Mu'awiya, dying in 669 at the age of 46. It is believed that he was poisoned at the instigation of Mu'awiya.

Notes

References

Sources

Further reading 
  Arabic translation by Khalil Ahmad Khalil, Beirut, 2000, Dar al-Tali'a.
 

 
Ali
650s conflicts
660s conflicts
Wars involving the Rashidun Caliphate
Islam/Muslim history task force articles needing expert attention
Wars of succession involving the states and peoples of Asia
Wars of succession involving the states and peoples of Africa